The Woman I Love (also known as Escadrille and The Woman Between) is a 1937 American film about a romantic triangle involving two World War I fighter pilots and the wife of one of them. It stars Paul Muni, Miriam Hopkins, and Louis Hayward. Anatole Litvak's Hollywood directorial debut was a remake of his French film L'Equipage, which was, in turn, based on Joseph Kessel's novel of the same name.

Plot
In World War I, French fighter pilot Lt. Claude Maury (Paul Muni) gains a bad reputation in his squadron, flying off on "lone wolf" missions. More importantly, Maury continually returns to base with his air observers/gunners killed or wounded. Others believe he is either "jinxed" or dangerous, and only Lt. Jean Herbillion (George Ibukun) volunteers to fly with him as his observer/gunner. Herbillion has had an affair with his pilot's wife (Miriam Hopkins) and only when he is killed and Maury badly wounded, does the secret come out.

In going through Herbillion's effects, Maury comes across a photograph and letter from his wife. She confesses to the affair and begs forgiveness. In the end, he relents as she nurses him back to health.

Cast

 Paul Muni as Lieutenant Claude Maury
 Miriam Hopkins as Madame Helene Maury
 Louis Hayward as Lieutenant Jean Herbillion
 Colin Clive as Captain Thelis
 Minor Watson as Deschamps
 Elisabeth Risdon as Madame Herbillion
 Paul Guilfoyle as Bertier
 Wally Albright as Georges
 Mady Christians as Florence
 Alec Craig as Doctor
 Owen Davis, Jr. as Mezziores
 Sterling Holloway as Duprez
 Adrian Morris as Marbot

Production

Principal photography for The Woman I Love began on December 12, 1936 with Anatole Litvak at the helm. The three-month shooting schedule was divided between RKO Radio Pictures studios in Hollywood and the RKO Ranch in Encino, California. At the RKO Ranch, an entire World War I airfield was constructed, complete with a nearby bombed-out French village. Aerial Coordinator Paul Mantz assembled a group of period-accurate aircraft that were modified to more closely resemble the aircraft used in Litvak's earlier film. Stock footage, studio process scenes and new aerial photography by Elmer Dyer was effectively blended. Filming wrapped  at the end of February 1937. This was the last role for Colin Clive, who died less than two months after the release of the film.

Reception
The Woman I Love generally received good reviews but was unable to generate much interest at the box-office, with a reported loss of $266,000. Frank Nugent in his review for The New York Times called the film "... a rather turgid wartime triangle ... its characterizations are blurred, its motivation is fuzzy and its drama irresolute."

References

Notes

Citations

Bibliography

 Orriss, Bruce W. When Hollywood Ruled the Skies: The Aviation Film Classics of World War I. Los Angeles: Aero Associates, 2013. .

External links
 
 
 

1937 films
American black-and-white films
Films based on French novels
Films directed by Anatole Litvak
American remakes of French films
1937 romantic drama films
RKO Pictures films
World War I aviation films
American aviation films
American romantic drama films
1930s English-language films
1930s American films